Kenneth Maxwell Wallace,  (born 26 July 1983) is an Australian sprint canoeist who has competed since the mid-2000s, winning gold at the 2008 Summer Olympics and at several World Championships.

Career
Born in Gosford, New South Wales, Wallace originally competed in Ironman events and only switched to sprint racing at the age of sixteen. Two years later he was the K-1 1000 m Junior World Champion in Curitiba, Brazil.

Wallace was selected to represent Australia at the 2006 ICF Canoe Sprint World Championships in Szeged, Hungary, where he placed fifth in the K-1 1000 m final.

In 2007, Wallace at the ICF World Championships held in Duisburg, Germany placed 4th in the K-1 1000m Final. This result qualified Australia a berth at the 2008 Olympic Games.

Wallace won two medals at the 2008 Summer Olympics in Beijing with gold in the K-1 500 m and bronze in the K-1 1000 m events. He also won two medals at the ICF Canoe Sprint World Championships with a gold (K-1 5000 m: 2010) and a bronze (K-1 500 m: 2009).

He was awarded the Order of Australia in 2009.

In February 2011, Wallace competed in the third season of the Channel Seven television series Australia's Greatest Athlete.

References

External links
Canoe09.ca profile
Australian Canoeing profile

Living people
1983 births
Australian male canoeists
Canoeists at the 2008 Summer Olympics
Canoeists at the 2012 Summer Olympics
Canoeists at the 2016 Summer Olympics
Olympic canoeists of Australia
Medalists at the 2008 Summer Olympics
Medalists at the 2016 Summer Olympics
Olympic gold medalists for Australia
Olympic bronze medalists for Australia
Olympic medalists in canoeing
ICF Canoe Sprint World Championships medalists in kayak
Australian Institute of Sport canoeists
Recipients of the Medal of the Order of Australia
People from Gosford
Sportsmen from New South Wales
21st-century Australian people